Tracy Smith (born 30 November 1964) is a Canadian athlete. She competed in the women's long jump at the 1988 Summer Olympics.

References

1964 births
Living people
Athletes (track and field) at the 1988 Summer Olympics
Canadian female long jumpers
Olympic track and field athletes of Canada
Sportspeople from New Westminster